Simply In Love is a 2006 album by Tony Christie. Forty years after his first solo single, Christie released Simply In Love - a collection of classic love songs and other covers including "Light My Fire" by The Doors and "God Only Knows" by The Beach Boys. The album was titled Simply In Love and dedicated to his wife Sue as they approached their 40th wedding anniversary.

Track listing 
People Will Say We're in Love - 3:36
Moon River - 3:32
My Funny Valentine - 5:37
The More I See You - 4:03
You've Got a Friend - 4:31
I Left My Heart in San Francisco - 4:53
Light My Fire - 3:17
This Guy's in Love with You - 4:01
Danny Boy - 3:21
Stranger in Paradise - 3:57
Every Breath You Take - 4:08
Life on Mars - 3:48
We've Only Just Begun - 4:24
God Only Knows - 3:49

References

2006 albums
Tony Christie albums